An in-service program is a professional training or staff development effort, where professionals are trained and discuss their work with others in their peer group.

It is a key component of continuing medical education for physicians, pharmacists, and other medical professionals. It is also common among public servants including educators and public safety officials.

In-service program also refers to some programs offered to enlisted members of the military while they are in service.

In-service programs also refers to educators, where they discuss methods and cases and work loads.

See also 
 Inset day
 Pre-service teacher education

References 

Continuing education